The 1974 Grand National was the 128th renewal of the Grand National horse race that took place at Aintree near Liverpool, England, on 30 March 1974. The race is famous for the second of Red Rum's three Grand National wins. L'Escargot finished second.

Finishing order

Non-finishers

Media coverage

David Coleman presented Grand National Grandstand, the fifteenth year the race was shown live.

References

 1974
Grand National
Grand National
20th century in Lancashire
March 1974 sports events in the United Kingdom